Amores con trampa (English title: Fooled into Love) is a Mexican telenovela produced by Emilio Larrosa for Televisa and broadcast in 2015 by Canal de las Estrellas. It is the remake of the telenovela Somos los Carmona produced in 2013. With production starting in November 2014.

Itatí Cantoral, Eduardo Yáñez, Ernesto Laguardia and África Zavala star as the protagonists, while Nora Salinas and Harry Geithner star as the antagonists.

Synopsis 
Amores con trampa follows the life of a rural family that moves to the capital after having sold their Ranch.

Tribute 
In the episode end of the soap opera, was a tribute to Mexican singer Joan Sebastian, where Maribel Guardia and  Julián Figueroa  performed the main theme of the soap opera "La trampa", a song that was composed by Joan Sebastian.

Cast

Main cast 
Itatí Cantoral as Isabel Velasco, wife of Santiago Velasco, a beautiful and distinguished woman who has as a priority to maintain their economic level.
Eduardo Yáñez as Facundo Carmona, a simple and humble man from the countryside. He is the husband of María Carmona, with whom he has four children he adores.
Ernesto Laguardia as Santiago Velasco, an ambitious man whose construction company faces bankruptcy. He will do whatever it takes to get out of this situation.
África Zavala as María Carmona, the beautiful wife of Facundo Carmona and loving mother of four.

Also main cast 
Nora Salinas as Estefany Del Real 
Ignacio López Tarso as Don Porfirio Carmona
Luz María Aguilar as Doña Perpetua Sánchez 
Harry Geithner as Esteban Antunez
Maribel Fernández "La Pelangocha" as Concepción "Conchita"
José Eduardo Derbez as Felipe Velasco
Aldo Guerra as Alberto Carmona
Boris Duflos as Diego Briseño
Scarlet Dergal as Rocío Velasco
Jessica Decote as Carmen Gloria "Yoya" Carmona Sánchez
Lore Graniewicz as Hilda de las Mercedes
Flor Martino as Francisca Ballesteros Catalán
Erika García as Jéssica
Kristel Moesgen as Nicol De García
Ceci Flores as Susana Carmona
Rubén López "Pillín Jr" as Jacinto Carmona
Jocelín Zuckerman as Alejandra Velasco
Emilio Caballero as Andrés Briseño

Supporting cast 
Agustín Arana as Florencio Gallardo
Lorena Herrera as Ángeles Sánchez

Guest cast 
Rosita Pelayo as Humilde Sánchez
Joan Sebastian as Himself
Lupillo Rivera as Himself
Julián Figueroa as Himself

Mexico broadcast  
From March 30 to September 18, 2015 Univision broadcast Amores con trampa weeknights at 8pm/7c in the United States replacing Mi corazón es tuyo. The last episode was broadcast on September 18, 2015 with Antes muerta que Lichita replacing it on September 22, 2015.

References

External links 

 Website

2015 telenovelas
Televisa telenovelas
Mexican telenovelas
2015 Mexican television series debuts
2015 Mexican television series endings
Mexican television series based on Chilean television series
Spanish-language telenovelas